Polo is a team sport played on horseback. 

Polo may also refer to:

Places

United States
 Polo Township, Carroll County, Arkansas
 Polo, Illinois, United States, a city
 Polo, Missouri, United States, a city northeast of Kansas City
 Polo, Ohio, an unincorporated community

Elsewhere
 Polo, Dominican Republic, a municipality
 Valenzuela, Philippines, a city in the region of Metro Manila formerly known as Polo
 Polo, Valenzuela, a barangay
 Boluo County, Huizhou, Guangdong, China

People
 Polo (surname)
 Polo (given name)
 Polo Barnes (1901–1981), American jazz clarinetist and saxophonist
 Polo Montañez, Cuban singer and songwriter born Fernando Borrego Linares (1955–2002)
 Polo Ravales, Filipino actor and model Paul Gruenberg (born 1982)
 Johnny Polo, former ring name of American professional wrestler Scott Levy (born 1964)
 Marco Polo (producer), Canadian hip hop producer born Marco Bruno
 Mohammed Polo, nickname of Ghanaian former footballer Alhaji Mohammed Ahmed (born 1956)
 Polo G, rapper from Chicago

Arts, entertainment, and media
  Polo (flamenco palo), palo, or musical form of flamenco
 Polo (music), a traditional musical style of Venezuela
 Polo, novel (by Jilly Cooper), within Rutshire Chronicles
 Polo TV, Polish station

Clothing
 Polo neck, a garment also known as a turtle neck
 Polo shirt, also known as a tennis shirt or golf shirt

Other uses
 Volkswagen Polo, a German subcompact car
 Polo (TransMilenio), a mass transit station in Bogotá, Colombia
 Hurricane Polo (disambiguation), various hurricanes
 Operation Polo, codename for the 1948 Indian annexation of Hyderabad
 ADOX Polo, 1960s camera model
 Polo (confectionery)
 Polo wraps, a bandage material for horses' legs

See also

 Alternative Democratic Pole ((Spanish: Polo Democrático Alternativo), a Colombian political party
 Polo Ralph Lauren, the flagship brand of the company
 Water polo, a team sport played in water
 Polos, type of crown
 Polos, a feature within the Balinese musical tradition Kotekan 
 
 Marco Polo (disambiguation)
 San Polo (disambiguation)